Tip drill may refer to:
 Tip drill (basketball), a basketball exercise
 "Tip Drill (song)", a song by Nelly that makes reference to African-American sexual slang.
 a type of small hand drill that uses very small drill bits (most smaller than 1/16")